The 2003–04 All-Ireland Junior Club Football Championship was the third staging of the All-Ireland Junior Club Football Championship since its establishment by the Gaelic Athletic Association.

The All-Ireland final was played on 30 May 2004 at Shamrock Park in Cremartin, between Wolfe Tones and Carbery Raners. Wolfe Tones won the match by 0-14 to 0-10 to claim their first ever championship title.

All-Ireland Junior Club Football Championship

All-Ireland final

References

2003 in Irish sport
2004 in Irish sport
All-Ireland Junior Club Football Championship
All-Ireland Junior Club Football Championship